The 14th Louisiana Infantry Regiment was a unit of volunteers recruited in Louisiana that fought in the Confederate States Army during the American Civil War. Formed in June 1861 as the 1st Regiment, Polish Brigade, the unit was later accepted into Confederate service as the 13th Regiment. After being sent to fight in the Eastern Theater of the American Civil War, it was renamed the 14th Regiment. In 1862, it fought at Yorktown, Williamsburg, Seven Pines, Beaver Dam Creek, Gaines' Mill and Glendale. At Glendale, the unit suffered a severe number of causalities and, thereafter, surviving members of the regiment dubbed the battle "the Slaughterhouse."  

After being assigned to the 1st Louisiana Brigade, the regiment fought at Cedar Mountain, Second Bull Run, and Antietam. It transferred to the 2nd Louisiana Brigade and served at Fredericksburg, Chancellorsville, Second Winchester, Gettysburg, Mine Run and the Wilderness. At Spotsylvania most of the regiment's soldiers were captured. Its remains fought at Cold Harbor, Monocacy, Third Winchester, Fisher's Hill, Cedar Creek, and Petersburg in 1864. A few survivors surrendered at Appomattox in 1865.

See also
List of Louisiana Confederate Civil War units
Louisiana in the Civil War

Notes

References

 

 

Units and formations of the Confederate States Army from Louisiana
1861 establishments in Louisiana
Military units and formations established in 1861
1865 disestablishments in Louisiana
Military units and formations disestablished in 1865